The Prime Minister of Lebanon, officially the President of the Council of Ministers, is the head of government and the head of the Council of Ministers of Lebanon. The Prime Minister is appointed by the president of Lebanon, with the consent of the plurality of the members of the Parliament of Lebanon (after the Taif Agreement, 1990). By convention, the office holder is always a Sunni Muslim.

The current prime minister is Najib Mikati, having taken office on 10 September 2021. Mikati became prime minister 13 months after Hassan Diab resigned on 10 August 2020 serving as caretaker prime minister until Mikati took over.

On July 26, 2021, New York Times among other newspapers, reported that "...billionaire telecoms tycoon, Najib Mikati, was appointed Monday to form Lebanon’s next government ... Mr. Mikati, 65, is the third politician delegated by the Parliament to form a government since the huge explosion nearly a year ago in the port of Beirut that killed more than 200 people and led to the cabinet in charge at the time resigning."

The Prime Minister is assisted by the Deputy Prime Minister of Lebanon.

History
The office was created on 23 May 1926, when the constitution of the state of Greater Lebanon was promulgated. In the summer of 1943, when the National Pact was agreed, it was decided that the office of the prime minister would always be reserved for a Sunni Muslim. From the creation of the office in 1926 to the end of the Lebanese Civil War, the constitution made little mention of the roles and duties of the office, and most of the office's powers were exercised through informal means rather than through constitutional procedures. Following the end of the Civil War and the ratification of the Ta'if Accord, the responsibilities of the prime minister were codified and clearly listed in the Constitution.

Differences with French constitution
While the 1926 Constitution of Greater Lebanon was roughly modeled after the French constitution (Greater Lebanon being under French mandate), the office of the prime minister in Lebanon was notably significantly weaker in Lebanon than in France, for the president was the sole person who can dismiss him (at will), while in France the prime minister is appointed by the president, and can only be removed by the Parliament through a vote of no confidence. This means that the prime minister of Lebanon was much more deferential to the president than his French counterpart. This situation changed following the Taif Agreement which transformed Lebanon into a parliamentary republic. Currently, the prime minister is appointed by the president who chooses the candidate which garners the support of the plurality of parliament members. The prime minister must form a government which can receive the confidence of parliament and the agreement of the president. After obtaining confidence, the prime minister can only be dismissed if they lose the confidence of parliament.

Past irregularities in the office of the prime minister
Twice in the past, when the president resigned or shortly before his term expired, the president broke the National Pact and appointed a Maronite Christian with the justification that he would assume the powers of the presidency.

During the Lebanese Civil War, outgoing president Amine Gemayel dismissed incumbent prime minister Selim Hoss and appointed Army general-in-chief Michel Aoun as Prime Minister 15 minutes before the expiry of his term. Hoss refused his dismissal, and this led to the creation of a dual government; one, mainly civilian and Muslim in West Beirut, and the other, mainly military and Christian in East Beirut.

Responsibilities and powers
The prime minister is the president of the Council of Ministers and the head of government. In addition, he is the deputy chair of the Supreme Defense Council.

His responsibilities are the following:

 Assume the negotiations for the formation of the government with parliament.
 Counter-sign all decrees signed by the president, except for the one appointing him or considering the government resigned.
 Present the Council of Minister's program to the Chamber of Deputies.
 He presides over the meetings of the Council of Ministers, except when the president attends, in which case he presides over them.
 In case of a vacancy in the presidency for whatever reason, he assumes the powers and responsibilities of the president in the narrow sense of "conducting the business"

Symbolic duties
Following the ratification of the Ta'if Accord, the Constitution laid out a preamble for the three "key" executive posts: the president, the prime minister, and the Council of Ministers. The preamble states the following:

In addition, the prime minister also holds these posts ex officio:

 Vice President of the Supreme Defense Council
 President of the Council of Ministers
 Head of the government

List of prime ministers

See also

 President of Lebanon
 Legislative Speaker of Lebanon

Notes

References

 
Politics of Lebanon
1943 establishments in Lebanon